The national colours of Canada were declared by King George V in 1921 to be red and white and are most prominently evident on the country's national flag. Red is symbolic of England and white of France, the colours having been used representatively by those countries in the past. The maple is one of the national symbols and red is the first leaf colour after spring budding & also the autumn colour of maple leaves.

History

Canada's national colours can trace their history to the First Crusade of the 11th century, during which Norman nobleman Bohemond I of Antioch distributed red crosses to the crusaders he led, so that they could affix them to their clothing "as a distinguishing mark". Thereafter, nations were identified by the colour of their cross, and in particular, England used a white cross on a red background and France a red cross on white. Eventually, France and England agreed to exchange their colours, and St George's Cross was adopted as an emblem of England. This was the flag used by John Cabot when he landed on the island of Newfoundland on his second voyage in 1497 under the commission of Henry VII of England. The two nations would eventually explore North America, where each claimed territory.

As a result of the proclamation of the Arms of Canada by King George V on 21 November 1921, red and white became Canada's official colours. The proclamation stated "a Royal helmet mantled argent doubled gules" and "a wreath of the colours argent and gules", in which argent refers to the colour white or silver, and gules to red, tinctures used to emblazon a coat of arms. In 1957, the Arms of Canada were modified—the maple leaves on the shield were changed from green to red "in recognition of Canada's official colours". The proclamation accepts both colours for the maple leaves, stating "three maple leaves conjoined on one stem proper", in which "proper" refers to the natural colour of the leaves, which is green in spring and summer, and red in autumn.

It was not until 1961, with the creation of the Queen's Personal Canadian Flag, that red and white became entrenched as the national colours.

Reproduction
For the Federal Identity Program operated by the Treasury Board Secretariat of the Government of Canada, official and signage colours are specified in technical specification T-145.

The red colour is named FIP red and represented by the hexadecimal triplet FF0000, the 8-bit per channel RGB value (255,0,0), the CMYK color (0,100,100,0), or the Pantone Color Matching System colour Pantone 032.

A second red colour, known as safety red, is also specified but not used for official symbols; it is represented by the hexadecimal triplet E8112D, RGB value (230,15,45), CMYK colour (0,90,75,0), or Pantone colour 185.

White is represented by CMYK colour white, and the de facto national colour black is represented as CMYK colour black; six more colours are defined for use by the government.

Uses

National flag of Canada

The national flag uses the national colours. Its red-white-red pattern is derived from the flag of the Royal Military College of Canada and the Canada General Service Medal of 1899.

Federal government branding
The national colours are used in federal government branding as part of the Federal Identity Program. This includes the use of the Canadian flag in the Canada wordmark, the "global identifier of the Government of Canada" specified in technical specification T-130.

Decorations
The Canadian Forces Decoration ribbon consists of four red bars separated by equally spaced thin white lines. The Canada Medal instituted on 14 October 1943 was specified to have a ribbon in the national colours, which was the same ribbon used for the Canada General Service Medal. The ill-fated medal was never awarded, and was abolished in 1966 with the introduction of the Order of Canada, which also has a red and white ribbon.

Sport
The Toronto Blue Jays, a franchise in Major League Baseball, honour Canada Day by wearing an alternate jersey instead of the team's usual uniform. In the 1990s, the team would wear red baseball caps, or a red uniform. In 2012, the team wore a red uniform with white lettering.

The Canadian national colours, and the de facto third colour black, are used prominently by ice hockey teams representing the nation, including the men's ice hockey team, men's junior ice hockey team, men's under-18 ice hockey team, men's ice sledge hockey team, men's inline hockey team, women's ice hockey team, and women's under-18 ice hockey team. The logo of Hockey Canada, the national governing body for ice hockey in Canada, is red, white, and black, though their specifications are different from those of the national colours.

See also
 Canadian royal symbols

Notes

References

External links
Canada's National Symbols - excerpt from The Flags of Canada by Alistair B. Fraser

Canada
National symbols of Canada